Robert Farquhar may refer to:
Robert Townsend Farquhar (1776–1830), British colonial governor
Robert D. Farquhar (1872–1967), American architect
Robert W. Farquhar (1932–2015) NASA engineer, trajectory specialist